Road signs in Indonesia are standardized road signs similar to those used in other nations but with certain distinctions. As a former Dutch colony, until the 1970s road signs in Indonesia closely followed The Netherlands rules on road signs. Nowadays, Indonesian road sign design are a mix of European, US MUTCD, Australia, New Zealand and Japanese road sign features. According to the 2014 Minister of Transport's Regulation No. 13 concerning Traffic Signs, the official typeface for road signs in Indonesia is Clearview.  Indonesia formerly used FHWA Series fonts (Highway Gothic) as the designated typeface though the rules are not being implemented properly.

Indonesian road signs use Indonesian, the official and the national language of Indonesia. However, English is also used for important public places such as tourist attractions and airports. Bilingual signs can be found in tourist areas such as Bali.

Indonesia signed the Vienna Convention on Road Signs and Signals but have yet to ratify the Convention.

Warning signs
Warning signs warn of possible dangers or unusual conditions ahead and alert motorists on the hazards to expect. Warning signs in Indonesia used to closely follow US MUTCD and Japanese diamond-shaped with yellow background and black-and-yellow outline but recently they change it to full black outline.

Intersections

Regulatory signs

Prohibitory signs
Prohibitory signs in Indonesia are circular and have a red border with diagonal bars except for Stop, Yield, and Railroad Crossing signs.

Mandatory signs
Mandatory signs in Indonesia follows the "Type A Mandatory Signs" as prescribed by the Vienna Convention, which is the European-style white-on-blue circular signs with addition of white border

Directional signs

Freeway signs 
Most of the signs in this section are custom-made by the tollroad operator and unavailable in the current regulations.

Information signs

Temporary signs 
Temporary signs generally follow New Zealand design, albeit with Clearview typeface instead of Highway Gothic typeface.

See also 
 Permenhub no 13/2014

References

Road transport in Indonesia
Indonesia